The Toronto Power Generating Station is a former generating station located along the Niagara River in Niagara Falls, Ontario, Canada, slightly upstream from the newer Rankine power station.  Completed in 1906 in the Beaux-Arts-style, the station was designed by architect E. J. Lennox and was built by the Electrical Development Company of Ontario 
(owned by William Mackenzie, Frederic Thomas Nicholls, and Henry Mill Pellatt) under supervision of Hugh L. Cooper to supply hydro-electric power to nearby Toronto, Ontario.

The plant is built on top of a deep wheel pit, with turbines at the bottom of the pit, turning generators at the top by means of long vertical shafts. The water from the turbines runs out through a brick-lined tailrace which eventually comes out at the base of the falls.

The plant ceased operations on February 15, 1974 as Ontario Hydro looked to make better use of the available water downriver at the Sir Adam Beck Hydroelectric Power Stations in Queenston. In addition, the plant produced "25 Cycle" electricity, now largely unused.  The vacant plant was designated a National Historic Site of Canada in 1983, due to its importance in the development of business, industry and technology in Ontario, its status as the first wholly Canadian-owned hydro-electric facility at Niagara Falls, and the unusual application of Beaux-Arts design to an industrial plant.

Ownership of the Toronto Power Generating Station was transferred to the Niagara Parks Commission in 2007.  Structural assessments were subsequently undertaken in order to consider future adaptive reuse options for the facility.  In its current empty state, the plant has been the subject of urban exploration activities.

References

External links

National Historic Sites in Ontario
Buildings and structures in Niagara Falls, Ontario
Energy infrastructure completed in 1913
Beaux-Arts architecture in Canada
E. J. Lennox buildings
1913 establishments in Ontario
Hydroelectric power stations in Ontario